{{Infobox university
|name            = Wayanad Muslim Orphanage - WMO
|native_name     =
|image_name      = Wmo emblem.jpg
|image_size      = 
|caption         =
|latin_name      =
|motto           = Respect the child as a person<ref name="Tehelka2014">{{cite web|url=http://www.tehelka.com/2014/06/charity-is-their-business-and-the-business-is-good/ |title=Charity is their business. And the business is good |work=Tehelka |place= New Delhi |date=30 June 2014}}</ref>
|motto_lang      = 
|mottoeng        = 
|tagline         =
|established     = 1967
|founders        = Marhoom K.P Haji,Neelikkandy Kunji Pokker Haji
|type            = Orphanage
|accessdate=
|staff           =
|faculty         = 
|president       = K K Ahammed Hajiu
|rector          =
|chancellor      =
|vice_chancellor = 
|visitor         = 
|dean            =
|head_label      =
|head            = MA Mohammed Jamal
|students        = 6000
|undergrad       =
|postgrad        =
|doctoral        =
|profess         =
|city            = Kalpetta
|state           = Kerala
|country         = India
|campus          = 
|free_label      = 
|free            = 
|colors          = 
|colours         =
|mascot          =
|Anthem          = 
|fightsong       =
|nickname        = WMO Muttil
|affiliations    = 
|footnotes       =
|website         = 
|address         = Kuttamangalam, Mandad (PO), Kalpetta, Wayanad-673122, Kerala, India
|coor            =
|logo            = Wmo logo.jpg
}}

Wayanad Muslim Orphanage (WMO) is a charitable institution based in Wayanad district, Kerala, India.The orphanage is located in Muttil village near Wayanad district headquarters Kalpetta.  It runs about 20 educational institutions apart from the charity outfits and small scale industrial firms. It includes a school, a college, foster home, crèche, an academy for Islamic studies, and a special school for visually or hearing impaired pupils.

WMO was established in 1967 under the leadership of Syed Abdul Rahman Bafaqi with a few children as a branch of the Mukkam Muslim Orphanage. As of 2007 gives food, clothes, shelter and protection to nearly 1,100 orphans and destitutes. In an article about its 40th anniversary in 2007, The Hindu'' wrote that the orphanage has been playing a vital role in improving the social and economical status of the Muslim community and the society at a whole in Wayanad district. It has criticized the dowry system that prevails apparently in the society and has organised several sans dowry wedding fetes in connection to that. This institution is managed and looked after by General Secretary M.A Mohammed Jamal for over decades. The current vice-president is Mayan Manima and Muhammed sha Master.Treasurer is P P Abdul kader.

Financing fraud accusations

In 2014, the Foreign Contribution Regulation Act Wing of Foreigners Division under the Ministry of Home Affairs (India) reported that WMO had received over 30 million rupees in the 2010-2011, 2011-2012, and 2012-2013 fiscal years from donors in Bahrain, Kuwait, Oman, Qatar, Saudi Arabia and the UAE without reporting those donations to the government while, also requesting and receiving state aid.

Educational institutions

Commercial enterprises

Other initiatives

External links
WMO Website

References

Education in Wayanad district
Islam in Kerala
Institutes of higher Islamic learning in Kerala